Gateway Church is a Christian church based in The Gateway Centre, Acomb, York, England. Formerly known as Acomb Christian Fellowship, it is part of the ChristCentral Churches family of churches, a part of the Newfrontiers movement of churches.

It has weekly worship services every Sunday morning at 10.30am at the Gateway Centre and encourages members to join a Lifegroup (small group) for community and fellowship. It adheres to the Evangelical Alliance Statement of Faith and operates under the legal structure of Gateway (York) CIO - a Charitable Incorporated Organisation.

The church was instrumental in the setting up of York Foodbank and runs a Christians Against Poverty free debt help service.

References 

Newfrontiers
Churches in York